Charles Bénitah (16 March 1907 – 1987) was a Moroccan Olympic fencer, automobile racer, pilot and all-around sportsman. He was born and died in Casablanca. He competed in the team épée event at the 1960 Summer Olympics.

Athletic career
In 1926, Bénitah was the Moroccan junior fencing champion for all categories as well as the Moroccan champion in the 400 meters. He also set a national record for the 300 meters, running it in 37 seconds. In 1928 he became the Moroccan senior fencing champion in all disciplines. Bénitah won the 1930 Anfa Grand Prix with an Amilcar Cyclecar and played on the Racing Hockey Club from 1923 through 1930.

References

External links
 

1907 births
1987 deaths
Moroccan male épée fencers
Olympic fencers of Morocco
Fencers at the 1960 Summer Olympics
Sportspeople from Casablanca